Ulma is a commune located in Suceava County, Bukovina, northeastern Romania. It is composed of five villages, namely: Costileva, Lupcina, Măgura, Nisipitu, and Ulma.

At the 2011 census, 59.4% of inhabitants were Romanians and 35.1% Ukrainians. At the 2002 census, 99% were Eastern Orthodox.

Politics and local administration

Communal council 

The commune's current local council has the following political composition, according to the results of the 2020 Romanian local elections:

References 

Communes in Suceava County
Localities in Southern Bukovina
Ukrainian communities in Romania
Duchy of Bukovina